The canton of Challans is an administrative division of the Vendée department, western France. Its borders were modified at the French canton reorganisation which came into effect in March 2015. Its seat is in Challans.

It consists of the following communes:
 
Apremont
Bois-de-Céné
Challans
La Chapelle-Palluau
Châteauneuf
Falleron
Froidfond
La Garnache
Grand'Landes
Maché
Palluau
Saint-Christophe-du-Ligneron
Saint-Étienne-du-Bois
Saint-Paul-Mont-Penit
Sallertaine

References

Cantons of Vendée